Antonin Canavese (4 April 1929 – 25 June 2016) was a French racing cyclist. He rode in the 1950 Tour de France.

References

1929 births
2016 deaths
French male cyclists
Place of birth missing